Bokmål is an official written standard for the Norwegian language, alongside Nynorsk. Bokmål is the preferred written standard of Norwegian for 85% to 90% of the population in Norway. There is no nationwide standard or agreement on the pronunciation of Bokmål.

Bokmål is regulated by the governmental Language Council of Norway. A related, more conservative orthographic standard, commonly known as Riksmål, is regulated by the non-governmental Norwegian Academy for Language and Literature. The written standard is a Norwegianised variety of the Danish language.

The first Bokmål orthography was officially adopted in 1907 under the name Riksmål after being under development since 1879. The architects behind the reform were Marius Nygaard and Jacob Jonathan Aars. It was an adaptation of written Danish, which was commonly used since the past union with Denmark, to the Dano-Norwegian koiné spoken by the Norwegian urban elite, especially in the capital. When the large conservative newspaper Aftenposten adopted the 1907 orthography in 1923, Danish writing was practically out of use in Norway. The name Bokmål was officially adopted in 1929 after a proposition to call the written language Dano-Norwegian lost by a single vote in the Lagting (a chamber in the Norwegian parliament).

The government does not regulate spoken Bokmål and recommends that normalised pronunciation should follow the phonology of the speaker's local dialect. Nevertheless, there is a spoken variety of Norwegian that, in the region of South-Eastern Norway, is commonly seen as the de facto standard for spoken Bokmål. In The Phonology of Norwegian, Gjert Kristoffersen writes that

Standard Østnorsk (literally 'Standard East Norwegian', or sometimes described as 'Urban East Norwegian') is the pronunciation most commonly given in dictionaries. However, Standard Østnorsk as a spoken language is not used (and does not have prestige) outside South-Eastern Norway. All spoken variations of the Norwegian language are used in the Storting (parliament) and in Norwegian national broadcasters such as NRK and TV 2, even in cases where the conventions of Bokmål are used. The spoken variation typically reflects the region the speaker grew up in.

History 
Up until about 1300, the written language of Norway, Old Norwegian, was essentially the same as the other Old Norse dialects. The speech, however, was gradually differentiated into local and regional dialects. As long as Norway remained an independent kingdom, the written language remained essentially constant.

In 1380, Norway entered into a personal union with Denmark. By the early 16th century, Norway had lost its separate political institutions, and together with Denmark formed the political unit known as Denmark–Norway until 1814, progressively becoming the weaker member of the union. During this period, the modern Danish and Norwegian languages emerged. Norwegian went through a Middle Norwegian transition, and a Danish written language more heavily influenced by Low German was gradually standardised. This process was aided by the Reformation, which prompted Christiern Pedersen's translation of the Bible into Danish. Remnants of written Old Norse and Norwegian were thus displaced by the Danish standard, which became used for virtually all administrative documents.

Norwegians used Danish primarily in writing, but it gradually came to be spoken by urban elites on formal or official occasions. Although Danish never became the spoken language of the vast majority of the population, by the time Norway's ties with Denmark were severed in 1814, a Dano-Norwegian vernacular often called the "educated daily speech" had become the mother tongue of elites in most Norwegian cities, such as Bergen, Kristiania and Trondheim. This Dano-Norwegian koiné could be described as Danish with regional Norwegian pronunciation (see Norwegian dialects), some Norwegian vocabulary, and simplified grammar.

With the gradual subsequent process of Norwegianisation of the written language used in the cities of Norway, from Danish to Bokmål and Riksmål, the upper-class sociolects in the cities changed accordingly. In 1814, when Norway was ceded from Denmark to Sweden, Norway defied Sweden and her allies, declared independence and adopted a democratic constitution. Although compelled to submit to a dynastic union with Sweden, this spark of independence continued to burn, influencing the evolution of language in Norway. Old language traditions were revived by the patriotic poet Henrik Wergeland (1808–1845), who championed an independent non-Danish written language. Haugen indicates that:
"Within the first generation of liberty, two solutions emerged and won adherents, one based on the speech of the upper class and one on that of the common people. The former called for Norwegianisation of the Danish writing, the latter for a brand new start."

The more conservative of the two language transitions was advanced by the work of writers like Peter Asbjørnsen and Jørgen Moe, schoolmaster and agitator for language reform Knud Knudsen, and Knudsen's famous disciple, Bjørnstjerne Bjørnson, as well as a more cautious Norwegianisation by Henrik Ibsen. In particular, Knudsen's work on language reform in the mid-19th century was important for the 1907 orthography and a subsequent reform in 1917, so much so that he is now often called the "father of Bokmål".

Controversy

Riksmål versus Bokmål

Since the creation of Landsmål, the Danish written in Norway was referred to as (det almindelige) Bogmaal etc. ("(The ordinary) book language"), e.g. in Den norske Literatur fra 1814 indtil vore Dage (Hans Olaf Hansen, 1862), or the synonym Bogsprog, e.g. in the 1885 decision that adopted Landsmål as a co-official language.

The term Riksmål (Rigsmaal), meaning National Language, was first proposed by Bjørnstjerne Bjørnson in 1899 as a name for the Norwegian variety of written Danish as well as spoken Dano-Norwegian. It was borrowed from Denmark where it denoted standard written and spoken Danish. The same year the Riksmål movement became organised under his leadership in order to fight against the growing influence of Nynorsk, eventually leading to the foundation of the non-governmental organisation Riksmålsforbundet in 1907, which he led until his death in 1910.

The 1907 reform documents do not mention the language by name, but the term Riksmål eventually caught on and was adopted by the Ministry of Church and Education in the years leading up to the 1917 spelling reform, appearing in its 1908 publication Utredning av spørsmaalet om et mulig samarbeide mellem landsmaal og riksmaal i retskrivningen ("Investigation of the question of a possible cooperation between Landmål and Riksmål with regards to orthography"). Through this work an official policy to merge the standards (to a common ) through spelling reforms came to be.

In line with these plans, the 1917 reform introduced some elements from Norwegian dialects and Nynorsk as optional alternatives to traditional Dano-Norwegian forms. The reform met some resistance from the Riksmål movement, and Riksmålsvernet (The Society for the Protection of Riksmål) was founded in 1919.

In 1929, the parliament voted to rename the written standards. Bokmål was re-introduced as the official name for the Dano-Norwegian standard, replacing Riksmål, while Landsmål was renamed Nynorsk.

In 1938 both written standards were heavily reformed and many common spellings and grammatical endings were made mandatory. This meant the removal of many traditional Dano-Norwegian forms in Bokmål, a decision that was harshly criticised by the Riksmål movement for being too radical and premature. While it criticised the adoption of Nynorsk spellings, it initially also expressed support for making the orthography more phonemic, for instance by removing silent h's in interrogative pronouns (which was done in Swedish a few years earlier).

The resistance culminated in the 1950s under the leadership of Arnulf Øverland. Riksmålsforbundet organised a parents' campaign against Samnorsk in 1951, and the Norwegian Academy for Language and Literature was founded in 1953. Because of this resistance, the 1959 reform was relatively modest, and some of the common traditional Danish spellings and inflections were admitted back into the standard through the reforms in 1981 and 2005.

Currently, Riksmål denotes a language form regulated by the non-governmental organisation The Norwegian Academy of Language and Literature. It is based on pre-1938 Bokmål and has been regulated by The Academy as a private alternative to the official Bokmål spelling standard since the 1950s. Over time it has accepted widespread "radical" spellings into the Riksmål standard. Since the official Samnorsk policy was abolished Riksmål and Bokmål have converged, and The Academy currently edits an online dictionary that covers both. The differences have diminished (now being comparable to American and British English differences), but The Academy still upholds its own standard.

Norway's most popular daily newspaper, Aftenposten, is notable for its use of Riksmål as its standard language. Use of Riksmål is rigorously pursued, even with regard to readers' letters, which are "translated" into the standard. Aftenposten gave up its most markedly conservative "signal words" in 1990.

Terminology

In the Norwegian discourse, the term Dano-Norwegian is seldom used with reference to contemporary Bokmål and its spoken varieties. The nationality of the language has been a hotly debated topic, and its users and proponents have generally not been fond of the implied association with Danish (hence the neutral names Riksmål and Bokmål, meaning state language and book language respectively). The debate intensified with the advent of Nynorsk in the 19th century, a written language based on rural Modern Norwegian dialects and puristic opposition to the Danish and Dano-Norwegian spoken in Norwegian cities.

Characteristics

Differences from Danish

The following table shows a few central differences between Bokmål and Danish.

Differences from the traditional Oslo dialect
Most natives of Oslo today speak a dialect that is an amalgamation of vikværsk (which is the technical term for the traditional dialects in the Oslofjord area) and written Danish; and subsequently Riksmål and Bokmål, which primarily inherited their non-Oslo elements from Danish. The present-day Oslo dialect is also influenced by other Eastern Norwegian dialects.

The following table shows some important cases where traditional Bokmål and Standard Østnorsk followed Danish rather than the traditional Oslo dialect as it is commonly portrayed in literature about Norwegian dialects. In many of these cases, radical Bokmål follows the traditional Oslo dialect and Nynorsk, and these forms are also given.

1 Closest match to the traditional Oslo dialect.

2 However, Bokmål uses ku "cow" and (now archaic) su "sow" exclusively.

See also 

History of Norway

References 

North Germanic languages

Norwegian (Bokmal)
Languages written in Latin script